The following is a list of ecoregions in Afghanistan, according to the World Wildlife Fund (WWF):

Terrestrial ecoregions

Temperate coniferous forests
 East Afghan montane conifer forests

Temperate grasslands, savannas, and shrublands
 Gissaro-Alai open woodlands

Montane grasslands and shrublands
Ghorat-Hazarajat alpine meadow
Hindu Kush alpine meadow
Karakoram-West Tibetan Plateau alpine steppe
Northwestern Himalayan alpine shrub and meadows
Pamir alpine desert and tundra
Sulaiman Range alpine meadows

Deserts and xeric shrublands
 Afghan Mountains semi-desert
 Badkhiz-Karabil semi-desert
 Baluchistan xeric woodlands
 Central Afghan Mountains xeric woodlands
 Central Persian desert basins
 Paropamisus xeric woodlands
 Registan-North Pakistan sandy desert

References
 C.Michael Hogan; World Wildlife Fund. 2012. Registan-North Pakistan sandy desert. Encyclopedia of Earth. National Council for Science and the Environment. Topic ed. Peter Saundry

 
Ecoregions
Ecoregions in Afghanistan
Afghanistan
Natural history of Afghanistan